Perigona is a genus of beetles in the family Carabidae, containing the following species:

 Perigona acupalpoides Bates, 1883 
 Perigona africana Csiki, 1924 
 Perigona andrewesi Jedlicka, 1935  
 Perigona angolana (Basilewsky, 1989) 
 Perigona angustata Fauvel, 1907 
 Perigona arrowi Jedlicka, 1935  
 Perigona bembidioides Alluaud, 1936 
 Perigona bigener Bates, 1892 
 Perigona breviuscula (Motschulsky, 1862) 
 Perigona brunnea Andrewes, 1930 
 Perigona castanea (Motschulsky, 1861) 
 Perigona columbiana Putzeys, 1878 
 Perigona congoana Burgeon, 1935 
 Perigona convexicollis Putzeys, 1875 
 Perigona coquereli Fairmaire, 1868 
 Perigona cordens Darlington, 1968  
 Perigona cordicollis Bates, 1882 
 Perigona dentifera Darlington, 1968 
 Perigona descarpentriesi (Deuve, 1998) 
 Perigona dorsata Darlington, 1964 
 Perigona elgonensis (Jeannel, 1935) 
 Perigona endogaeus (Jeannel, 1935) 
 Perigona erimae Csiki, 1924 
 Perigona erythroma Andrewes, 1929 
 Perigona exigua (A.Morawitz, 1863) 
 Perigona franzi (Basilewsky, 1961)
 Perigona gerardi Perrault, 1985 
 Perigona grandis Jedlicka, 1935 
 Perigona guadeloupensis Fleutiaux & Salle, 1889 
 Perigona heterodera Alluaud, 1936 
 Perigona hirtella (Basilewsky, 1953) 
 Perigona ituriana (Leleup, 1954) 
 Perigona jacobsoni Andrewes, 1929 
 Perigona katonae Csiki, 1924 
 Perigona kivuana (Basilewsky, 1989) 
 Perigona laevigata (Bates, 1872) 
 Perigona laevilateris (Bates, 1872) 
 Perigona lata Andrewes, 1929 
 Perigona lebioides Csiki, 1924 
 Perigona leleupi (Basilewsky, 1951)  
 Perigona livens Putzeys, 1873 
 Perigona luberoensis (Basilewsky, 1989) 
 Perigona ludovici Csiki, 1924 
 Perigona malayensis Csiki, 1924 
 Perigona maynei Basilewsky, 1949 
 Perigona mediornata Basilewsky, 1989 
 Perigona melanocephala Jeannel, 1948 
 Perigona microphthalma Jeannel, 1950 
 Perigona microps Darlington, 1934 
 Perigona milicola (Basilewsky, 1950) 
 Perigona minor Putzeys, 1875 
 Perigona minuscula (Basilewsky, 1989) 
 Perigona nigriceps (Dejean, 1831) 
 Perigona nigricollis (Motschulsky, 1851) 
 Perigona nigrifrons (Motschulsky, 1859) 
 Perigona nigrociliata Basilewsky, 1953 
 Perigona obscurata Alluaud, 1936 
 Perigona obscuriceps Louwerens, 1951 
 Perigona ozaenoides (Bates, 1872) 
 Perigona pallida Laporte De Castelnau, 1835 
 Perigona pallipennis (Leconte, 1853) 
 Perigona panganica Csiki, 1924 
 Perigona papuana Csiki, 1924 
 Perigona parallela Chaudoir, 1878 
 Perigona parvicollis Andrewes, 1929 
 Perigona picea Darlington, 1934 
 Perigona picipennis Louwerens, 1951 
 Perigona picta Darlington, 1964 
 Perigona plagiata Putzeys, 1875 
 Perigona plesia Alluaud, 1936 
 Perigona plesioides Jeannel, 1948 
 Perigona praecisa (Bates, 1872) 
 Perigona prasina Alluaud, 1936 
 Perigona procera Fauvel, 1907 
 Perigona pubescens Jeannel, 1941 
 Perigona pygmaea Andrewes, 1930  
 Perigona rex Darlington, 1968  
 Perigona rossi Darlington, 1968  
 Perigona rotundicollis Basilewsky, 1976 
 Perigona ruandana (Basilewsky, 1956) 
 Perigona rubida Andrewes, 1936 
 Perigona ruficollis (Motschulsky, 1851) 
 Perigona rufilabris (W.J.Macleay, 1871) 
 Perigona schmitzi (Basilewsky, 1989) 
 Perigona schoutedeni (Leleup, 1954) 
 Perigona serica Andrewes, 1929 
 Perigona sexstriata (Bates, 1872) 
 Perigona sinuata Bates, 1883 
 Perigona sinuaticollis Bates, 1886 
 Perigona subcordata Putzeys, 1875 
 Perigona subcyanescens Putzeys, 1875 
 Perigona sulcatipennis Andrewes, 1930 
 Perigona suturalis Putzeys, 1875 
 Perigona suturella Fairmaire, 1868 
 Perigona termitis Jeannel, 1941 
 Perigona tonkinensis (Silvestri, 1946) 
 Perigona tricolor (Laporte De Castelnau, 1867) 
 Perigona tronqueti Perrault, 1988 
 Perigona tumbanus (Basilewsky, 1956) 
 Perigona uluguruana Basilewsky, 1976 
 Perigona viridimicans (Jeannel, 1948) 
 Perigona vixstriata (Bates, 1872) 
 Perigona wachteli Baehr, 2004 
 Perigona yasumatsui Habu, 1953 
 Perigona zanzibarica Chaudoir, 1878

References

Lebiinae